ERIH PLUS (originally called the European Reference Index for the Humanities or ERIH) is an index containing bibliographic information on academic journals in the humanities and social sciences (SSH). The index includes all journals that meet the following requirements: "explicit procedures for external peer review; an academic editorial board, with members affiliated with universities or other independent research organizations; a valid ISSN code, confirmed by the international ISSN register; abstracts in English and/or another international language relevant for the field for all published articles; information on author affiliations and addresses; a maximum two thirds of the authors published in the journal from the same institution".

ERIH was originally established by the European Science Foundation and was transferred to the NSD - Norwegian Centre for Research Data in 2014, mainly because it already operated the Norwegian Register for Scientific Journals, Series and Publisers. At the same time it was extended to also include social science disciplines and renamed ERIH PLUS. The aim of ERIH PLUS is to increase the visibility and availability of SSH. The index goes beyond the commercial indexing services by providing a comprehensive coverage of the scholarly communication and publishing in the fields, enabling researchers to better disseminate their work in national and international languages. As of July 1st 2021, the ownership was transferred to the fresh Norwegian Directorate for Higher Education and Skills.

References

External links 
 

Bibliographic databases and indexes